Jhermy Fuentes Mendia (born 22 December 1995) is a Bolivian footballer who plays as a midfielder. She has been a member of the Bolivia women's national team.

International career
Fuentes represented Bolivia at the 2014 South American U-20 Women's Championship. At senior level, she played a friendly against Brazil in 2017.

References

1995 births
Living people
Women's association football midfielders
Bolivian women's footballers
Bolivia women's international footballers